Antonio Michael "Tony" Meola (born February 21, 1969) is an American former professional soccer player who played as a goalkeeper. He represented the United States national team at the 1990, 1994, and 2002 World Cups. From 1996 to 2006, he played in Major League Soccer, the U.S. top soccer division, where he obtained multiple honors. Meola is currently a radio host on SiriusXM FC.

Early life

Meola was born in Belleville, New Jersey. He grew up in Kearny. He played boys' soccer for Kearny High School. He learned his love for the game from his father, Vincenzo, who played for Italian second division club Avellino before immigrating to the U.S. Meola was All-State both as a goalkeeper (1985) and a forward (1986). He had a part in 41 clean sheets and scored 42 goals during his high school career.

In 1999, Meola was named by The Star-Ledger as one of the top ten New Jersey high school soccer players of the 1980s. Meola not only excelled at soccer, he was a three-sport varsity letterman.  He was the captain of the school's basketball team and was named an All-State baseball player in 1987.  The New York Yankees drafted him out of high school, though Meola did not sign a contract with them.

College

Meola attended the University of Virginia on a soccer/baseball athletic scholarship.  While at Virginia, he played under coach Bruce Arena.  By the time he was playing for the Cavaliers, he had already begun to make a name for himself on the international scene.  In October 1987, he backstopped the U.S. U-20 national team at the 1987 FIFA World Youth Championship.  He earned first team All American honors both his freshman and sophomore years.  He also won the Hermann Trophy as a freshman in 1988 and the MAC Award as a sophomore in 1989.  On December 15, 1989 he announced that he was leaving U.Va. to pursue a career with the U.S. national team.

Meola also lettered for the U.Va. Cavaliers baseball team his freshman year of 1988 as a third baseman.

Professional career

Early soccer career

Meola had signed with the U.S. Soccer Federation before the 1990 FIFA World Cup.  Following the cup, Meola signed on loan with English second division club Brighton & Hove Albion where he played eleven games; only two were league games.  He gained his first start when he replaced the injured Perry Digweed and promptly won man of the match honors.  On September 14, 1990, Meola was transferred to second division club Watford before moving back to the U.S.,  which he did when he was unable to renew his work permit due to his inability to gain first team time with Watford.

In 1991, Meola played for the Fort Lauderdale Strikers of the American Professional Soccer League.  He shared the goal with Arnie Mausser.

American football and acting

Meola attempted to become a placekicker with NFL's New York Jets in July 1994 but didn't pass the try-outs and was cut.

Although Meola signed with the Buffalo Blizzard of the NPSL on December 14, 1994 for the 1994–95 indoor season and became the team's starting keeper, he left in mid-February 1995, as he had taken a lead role in the off-Broadway play Tony and Tina's Wedding and needed to join the cast.

United Soccer Leagues

In February 1995, Meola joined the Long Island Rough Riders for its upcoming 1995 USISL season. That year the Rough Riders claimed the USISL championship.

Metrostars

Meola spent three weeks in February 1996 training with Italian club Parma. Upon the creation of Major League Soccer, he was allocated to the NY/NJ MetroStars, for whom he played between 1996 and 1998, starting almost every game. During his time with the MetroStars, he set a league record with nine shutouts in 1996. He did not win the MLS Goalkeeper of the Year Award, however; the honor went to Mark Dodd.

Kansas City Wizards

Meola was traded to the Kansas City Wizards (with Alexi Lalas for Mark Chung and Mike Ammann) in 1999, but missed most of his first year in the midwest due to injury. Chris Snitko and David Winner backstopped during Meola's absence. The team struggled for results and wins with both Winner and Snitko.

In 2000, Meola was named League MVP, Goalkeeper of the Year, and MLS Cup MVP as he led Kansas City to the championship. He set a new league record by recording 16 shutouts. Meola was voted into the 2000 MLS All Star Game playing the first half in goal, and made a cameo in the 2nd half up top as a forward.

Meola played for the Wizards through the 2004 MLS season. That year, an injury forced him out of contention. Bo Oshoniyi took over the goalkeeping position, although Meola recorded a shutout in the Wizards' U.S. Open Cup final win over the Chicago Fire, and Meola was not asked back for next season, instead stuck with Oshoniyi as the starting goalkeeper.

Metrostars/Red Bulls return

Meola was re-acquired by the MetroStars in June 2005. He was named to the MLS All-Time Best XI after the season.  Following the 2006 season, Meola was waived by the team, now known as the New York Red Bulls.

New Jersey Ironmen
Meola signed a contract in summer 2007 with the New Jersey Ironmen, an indoor soccer expansion team based in Newark, NJ that played in the Major Indoor Soccer League. As starting goalie, Meola led the team to the playoffs in its first year.

International career
Meola made his U.S. national team debut on June 10, 1988, against Ecuador.  Meola's second cap came in a June 4, 1989 victory over Peru in the Marlboro Cup which won the U.S. the cup.  The team took the trophy to the Scots-American Club in Kearny, New Jersey.  After the party, Meola drove back to the team's hotel, dropped the trophy at the front desk and drove home.  As he remembers it, "A week later Doug Newman called me up and asked where the cup was.  I told him I'd left it at for him at the hotel. . . . I'm sure they got it back.  Back then there weren't too many cups in U.S. Soccer."

Later in the summer, the national team went on a tour of Italy, playing several Serie A teams.  At the time, David Vanole was the U.S. starter, but he and Meola had traded goalkeeper duties over the previous month as Vanole fought USSF on a contract dispute and attempted to get his burgeoning weight under control.  U.S. coach Bob Gansler intended to start Meola against A.S. Roma, but Meola was injured in a freak accident when a ball struck his head during practice.  Vanole started in his place, but let in three weak goals in a 4-3 U.S. victory. Gansler benched Vanole, who never again played for the U.S., and turned to Meola as his starting keeper. Meola played the remaining U.S. qualifying games for the 1990 FIFA World Cup, including the famous 1–0 victory over Trinidad and Tobago which clinched a spot in the finals for the U.S. He then played every minute in goal for the U.S. in the 1990 FIFA World Cup.

Meola remained the keeper of choice for the U.S. national team from 1990 through the 1994 FIFA World Cup.  At that tournament, his play and ponytail made him a recognizable face around the country.  After the U.S. loss to Brazil in the second round of the World Cup, Meola informed the U.S. coach Bora Milutinović that he intended to pursue a professional American football career as a placekicker.  Milutinović never called Meola back to the U.S. team.

It was not until January 1999 that Meola again played for the U.S.  By that time, Kasey Keller and  Brad Friedel were competing for the starting goalkeeper spot on the team and Meola never regained the first team place he had enjoyed in the early 1990s.  However, he continued to play for the U.S. and earned his 100th cap in 2006. He was the third-choice goalkeeper at the 2002 FIFA World Cup behind Friedel and Keller.

Coach

Jacksonville Armada
On November 24, 2015, Meola was hired for his first coaching position in the NASL with the Jacksonville Armada FC. Meola recorded his first managerial victory in the club's home opener against Miami FC on April 15, 2016.  Meola was fired on August 7, 2016 after posting an overall record of 2W-6D-10L, including a 1-2-5 record in the Fall Season and 1-4-5 showing in the Spring Season.

Coaching record

Personal life
Meola's non-soccer ventures include appearing Off-Broadway in Tony and Tina's Wedding in 1995, and running his own mortgage firm.

Meola was the original drummer for New Jersey's cover band Mushmouth and still plays with the band on occasions. 
 
A soccer video game for the SNES with Meola's name, Tony Meola's Sidekicks Soccer (also known as Super Copa and Ramos Rui no World Wide Soccer), was released in 1993.

In 2012, Meola was inducted into the National Soccer Hall of Fame.

Meola now lives in Toms River, New Jersey and has three children, Jon, Kylie, and Aidan. Jon Meola was a member of the University of Virginia baseball team during the 2016 season, before transferring to Stetson University.

Broadcasting
Meola worked on beIN Sports coverage of Copa America. He also commentated MLS games for FOX when their lead commentators weren't available. 
In 2018, he was a featured commentator on FOX and FS1 for their United States broadcasts of the FIFA World Cup.
In 2020, he was announced to be the color commentator for the Chicago Fire FC.

Career statistics

Honors

Professional
Kansas City Wizards
MLS Cup: 2000

International
United States
CONCACAF Gold Cup: 1991, 2002

IndividualMLS Goalkeeper of the Year:''' 2000

See also
 List of men's footballers with 100 or more international caps

References

1969 births
Living people
Expatriate footballers in England
All-American men's college soccer players
American Professional Soccer League players
Brighton & Hove Albion F.C. players
Buffalo Blizzard players
1990 FIFA World Cup players
1991 CONCACAF Gold Cup players
1992 King Fahd Cup players
1993 Copa América players
1993 CONCACAF Gold Cup players
1994 FIFA World Cup players
2000 CONCACAF Gold Cup players
2002 CONCACAF Gold Cup players
2002 FIFA World Cup players
CONCACAF Gold Cup-winning players
Association football goalkeepers
Fort Lauderdale Strikers (1988–1994) players
Sporting Kansas City players
American soccer players
American expatriate soccer players
American people of Italian descent
American expatriate sportspeople in England
Kearny High School (New Jersey) alumni
NCAA Division I Men's Soccer Tournament Most Outstanding Player winners
Long Island Rough Riders players
New Jersey Ironmen (MISL) players
Major League Soccer players
Major League Soccer All-Stars
New York Red Bulls players
National Professional Soccer League (1984–2001) players
People from Belleville, New Jersey
People from Kearny, New Jersey
Sportspeople from Toms River, New Jersey
United States men's international soccer players
USISL players
Virginia Cavaliers men's soccer players
Virginia Cavaliers baseball players
FIFA Century Club
Soccer players from New Jersey
Watford F.C. players
New Jersey Ironmen players
United States men's under-20 international soccer players
Sportspeople from Hudson County, New Jersey
Jacksonville Armada FC coaches
National Soccer Hall of Fame members
Hermann Trophy men's winners
Association football players that played in the NFL